The lesser sand plover (Charadrius mongolus) is a small wader in the plover family of birds. The spelling is commonly given as lesser sand-plover, but the official British Ornithologists' Union spelling is "lesser sand plover". The genus name Charadrius is a Late Latin word for a yellowish bird mentioned in the fourth-century Vulgate. It derives from Ancient Greek kharadrios a bird found in ravines and river valleys (kharadra, "ravine"). The specific mongolus is  Latin and refers to Mongolia which at the time of naming referred to a larger area than the present country.

Taxonomy
There are five races, and the large east Asian forms, C. m. mongolus and C. m. stegmanni, are sometimes given specific status as Mongolian plover, Charadrius mongolus. If the taxonomic split is accepted, lesser sand plover as then defined becomes Charadrius atrifrons, including the three races atrifrons, pamirensis and schaeferi.

A study published in 2022 proposed that the "mongolus" Group is the sister group of great sand plover, and "atrifrons" Group is the sister group of them two. So a taxonomic split of lesser sand plover is needed. The authors suggested new scientific and common English name for them:

 Siberian sand plover (Charadrius mongolus), C. m. mongolus and C. m. stegmanni;
 Tibetan sand plover (Charadrius atrifrons), C. m. atrifrons, C. m. pamirensis and C. m. schaeferi;
 Desert sand plover (Charadrius leschenaultii), formerly great sand plover.

Distribution
It breeds above the tree line in the Himalayas and discontinuously across to bare coastal plains in north-eastern Siberia, with the Mongolian plover in the eastern part of the range; it has also bred in Alaska. It nests in a bare ground scrape, laying three eggs. This species is strongly migratory, wintering on sandy beaches in east Africa, south Asia and Australasia. It is a very rare vagrant in western Europe, but of the three individuals recorded in Great Britain up to 2003, one was a Mongolian plover.

Description
This chunky plover is long-legged and long-billed. Breeding males have grey backs and white underparts. The breast, forehead and nape are chestnut, and there is a black eye mask. The female is duller, and winter and juvenile birds lack the chestnut, apart from a hint of rufous on the head. Legs are dark and the bill black.

In all plumages, this species is very similar to the greater sand plover, Charadrius leschenaultii. Separating the species may be straightforward in mixed wintering flocks on an Indian beach, where the difference in size and structure is obvious; it is more difficult to identify a lone vagrant to western Europe, where both species are very rare. The problem is compounded in that the Middle Eastern race of greater sand plover is the most similar to the lesser. The lesser usually has darker legs, a white forehead, and a more even white wing bar than the greater.

Ecology
The lesser sand plover's feeds on insects, crustaceans and annelid worms, which are obtained by a run-and-pause technique, rather than the steady probing of some other wader groups. This species takes fewer steps and shorter pauses than the greater sand plover when feeding.

The flight call is a hard trill.

The lesser sand plover is one of the species to which the Agreement on the Conservation of African-Eurasian Migratory Waterbirds (AEWA) applies.

Identification
Size is one of the factors distinguishing a lesser sand plover from a greater sand plover, with the lesser being slightly smaller. However, it is not easy to rely on size alone especially when seen individually. The length of the bill is another distinguishing feature, with the lesser generally having a shorter bill compared to a greater. The colour of the legs in a lesser sand plover is generally darker, ranging from black to grey, while in a greater sand plover it is much paler, ranging from grey to yellowish.

References

Further reading
Taylor, P.B. (1987) Field identification of Greater and Lesser Sandplovers, pp. 15–20 in International Bird Identification: Proceedings of the 4th International Identification Meeting, Eilat, 1st - 8th November 1986 International Birdwatching Centre Eilat

External links

lesser sand plover
Birds of Asia
Birds of East Africa
lesser sand plover
Articles containing video clips
Taxa named by Peter Simon Pallas